The Florida A&M Rattlers basketball team is the basketball team that represent Florida A&M University in Tallahassee, Florida. The school's team currently competes in the Southwestern Athletic Conference. The team last played in the NCAA Division I men's basketball tournament in 2007. Their home arena is the Teaching Gym/Alfred Lawson, Jr. Multipurpose Center, which seats a maximum of 9,639.

Postseason results

NCAA Division I Tournament results
The Rattlers have appeared in the NCAA Division I Tournament three times. Their combined record is 1–3.

NCAA Division II tournament results
The Rattlers have appeared in the NCAA Division II Tournament four times. Their combined record is 3–4.

Rattlers in the NBA
Jerome James
Clemon Johnson
Samuel Watts
Bob Williams

Rattlers in international leagues

Amin Stevens (born 1990), professional basketball player for Elitzur Kiryat Ata in Israel

References

External links